Eagle Township is one of seventeen rural townships in Black Hawk County, Iowa, USA.  As of the 2000 census, its population was 511.

History
Eagle Township was organized in 1858.

Geography
According to the USGS, it contains two cemeteries: Eagle and Saint Mary's of Mount Carmel.

References

External links
 US-Counties.com
 City-Data.com

Townships in Black Hawk County, Iowa
Waterloo – Cedar Falls metropolitan area
Townships in Iowa
1858 establishments in Iowa
Populated places established in 1858